Saint Lucas may refer to:

Individuals
Saint Lucas del Espiritu Santos, a Dominican Catholic priest martyred in 1633
Saint Lucius of Caesarea, one of the Martyrs of Caesarea also known as both Lucas and Luke
Saint Luke the Evangelist, one of the purported canonical Gospel authors often known as Lucas

Locations
São Lucas (district of São Paulo), a Brazilian town district often known as "Saint Lucas"
St. Lucas, Iowa, an American city

See also
Lucas (disambiguation)
Saint Lucius (disambiguation)
Saint Luke (disambiguation)
San Lucas (disambiguation)
St. Luke's (disambiguation)